Manuel Sanchís Hontiyuelo (born 23 May 1965) is a Spanish retired footballer who played as a sweeper.

A part of the famous La Quinta del Buitre which stemmed from the Real Madrid youth academy, he was the only of its five members to spend his entire career with the club. His father, Manuel Sanchís, also played for Real Madrid, and both were Spanish internationals.

Sanchís appeared in more than 700 competitive matches for his only club, and represented the national team in one World Cup and one European Championship.

Club career
A product of Real Madrid's prolific youth system, Madrid-born Sanchís made his debut with the first team on 4 December 1983, scoring the game's only goal at Real Murcia and finishing his debut season with a further 17 appearances (and two goals) for the main squad.

During the following 15 years, Sanchís only appeared in less than 30 matches in two, and was instrumental in the team's several conquests, including six La Liga championships, two UEFA Champions League and two UEFA Cups. In the 1999–2000 campaign he featured sparingly, but still helped to their eighth European Cup, playing 11 minutes in the final against fellow Spanish side Valencia in a 3–0 win.

Sanchís retired in 2001 at the age of 36, having played 710 overall games for his only club – 523 of those in the league – while also captaining it during 13 years.

International career
After excelling with the Spanish under-21s, with which he won the 1986 UEFA European Championship, Sanchís made his senior debut on 12 November of that year in a UEFA Euro 1988 qualifier against Romania (1–0 win). He went on to earn 48 full caps, appearing at both Euro 1988 and the 1990 FIFA World Cup.

Sanchís' last match was a friendly with the United States, on 11 March 1992.

Style of play
As a central defender, Sanchís stood out for his defensive composure, placement and agility. He set a new standard within his club due to both his sporting and human skills. An aggressive yet fair player, he was also noted for his tactical intelligence and positional sense, and usually played as a sweeper.

Career statistics

Club

Notes

International

Honours

Club
Real Madrid Castilla
Segunda División: 1983–84

Real Madrid
La Liga: 1985–86, 1986–87, 1987–88, 1988–89, 1989–90, 1994–95, 1996–97, 2000–01
Copa del Rey: 1988–89, 1992–93
Copa de la Liga: 1985
Supercopa de España: 1988, 1989, 1990, 1993, 1997
UEFA Champions League: 1997–98, 1999–2000
UEFA Cup: 1984–85, 1985–86
Intercontinental Cup: 1998

International
Spain
UEFA European Under-21 Championship: 1986

Individual
Spanish Footballer of the Year (El País): 1989–90

See also
 List of La Liga players (400+ appearances)
List of one-club men in association football
 List of Real Madrid CF records and statistics

References

External links

 Real Madrid biography

1965 births
Living people
Footballers from Madrid
Spanish footballers
Association football defenders
La Liga players
Segunda División players
Real Madrid Castilla footballers
Real Madrid CF players
UEFA Champions League winning players
UEFA Cup winning players
Spain youth international footballers
Spain under-21 international footballers
Spain under-23 international footballers
Spain international footballers
UEFA Euro 1988 players
1990 FIFA World Cup players
Spanish association football commentators